Muricopsis schrammi is a species of sea snail, a marine gastropod mollusk in the family Muricidae, the murex snails or rock snails.

Description
The length of the shell attains 9 mm.

Distribution
This marine species occurs off Guadeloupe.

References

 Fischer-Piette, E., 1950. Liste des types décrits dans le Journal de Conchyliologie et conservés dans la collection de ce journal (avec planches)(suite). Journal de Conchyliologie 90: 149–180

External links
 MNHN, Paris: lectotype
 Crosse H. (1863). Description d'une espèce nouvelle de la Guadeloupe. Journal de Conchyliologie. 11(1): 82–84

Muricidae
Gastropods described in 1863